Sierra de Cucalón is a  long system of mountain ranges in Aragon, Spain, located between the comarcas of Jiloca and Cuencas Mineras.

Geography
These mountains are part of the Iberian System and are often covered with snow in the winter. Rivers Huerva and Martín have their source in these ranges.

The Ermita de la Virgen de Pelarda is located in the Pelarda range, close to Olalla.

Subranges
Two main ranges run parallel to each other, the northern one is Sierra de Oriche, also known as "Las Rochas", and the southern one, smoother and covered with forest, as Sierra de Pelarda or Sierra de la Pelarda (also known as "Sierra de Fonfría" after the town of Fonfría in its central section) extending eastwards as Sierra Pedregosa. 
This whole system of mountain ranges is named after the town of Cucalón, located at the western end.
 
The ridge's highest summits are Pelarda (1,517 m), in Sierra de Pelarda, and La Modorra (1,478 m), located at the NW end of the Sierra de Oriche. Other important summits are El Marujal (1,486 m), Cerro del Ortigal (1,429 m), Alto del Puerto de Fonfría (1,501 m), La Rocha (1,340 m) and La Retuerta (1,492 m). All main peaks are inconspicuous except for La Modorra.

Ecology
The Sierra de Pelarda mountains are covered with forest made up pine, Carrasca (Quercus ilex), cork oak, and juniper trees. There are many endangered species living in these relatively uninhabited mountains, far from human intervention.

Features

References

External links

Sierra de Cucalón
Ascensión a el Pelarda (1512 m)
Santuario de la Virgen de Pelarda

Cucalon
Cucalon